Edelsbrunner is a surname. Notable people with the surname include:

Herbert Edelsbrunner (born 1958), Austrian-American computer scientist
Founder of Edelsbrunner Automobile München